Carslaw is a British surname. Notable people with the surname include:

 Evelyn Carslaw (1881–1968), Scottish painter
 Horatio Scott Carslaw (1870–1954), Scottish-Australian mathematician
 Ken Carslaw, British scientist

Surnames of British Isles origin